Bounty Tracker is a 1993 Direct-To-Video action film starring Lorenzo Lamas and Matthias Hues. It was directed by Kurt Anderson.

Plot
Staff in a tax advisor office are brutally killed by a group of professional assassins led by the ruthless Erik Gauss; used survivor is Paul Damone unaware that his colleague, Greco, used the office to launder the dirty money of the gangster Louis Sarazin, and that he found testimony as head of his impending trial. Paul's brother Johnny is an ex-cop turned bounty hunter in Boston. When he arrives in Los Angeles he finds him in his brother's house, he is associated by the police assigned to protect him; in a second ambush, however, the killers manage to kill Paul in his home, so Johnny goes on their trail to take revenge.

Cast

References

External links
 

1993 films
1993 action films
American martial arts films
1993 martial arts films
1990s English-language films
Films directed by Kurt Anderson
1990s American films